The World Energy Council is a global forum for thought-leadership and tangible engagement with headquarters in London. Its mission is 'To promote the sustainable supply and use of energy for the greatest benefit of all people'.

The idea for the foundation of the Council came from Daniel Nicol Dunlop in the 1920s. He wanted to gather experts from all around the world to discuss current and future energy issues. He organised in 1923 first national committees, which organised the first World Power Conference (WPC) in 1924. 1,700 experts from 40 countries met in London to discuss energy issues. The meeting was a success and the participants decided on July 11, 1924 to establish a permanent organisation named World Power Conference. Dunlop was elected as its first Secretary General. In 1968 the name was changed to World Energy Conference, and in 1989 it became the World Energy Council.

The World Energy Council  is the principal impartial network of leaders and practitioners promoting an affordable, stable and environmentally sensitive energy system for the greatest benefit of all. Formed in 1923, the Council is the UN-accredited global energy body, representing the entire energy spectrum, with more than 3,000 member organisations located in over 90 countries and drawn from governments, private and state corporations, academia, NGOs and energy-related stakeholders. The World Energy Council informs global, regional and national energy strategies by hosting high-level events, publishing authoritative studies, and working through its extensive member network to facilitate the world’s energy policy dialogue. Today, the Council has Member Committees established in over 90 countries, which represent over 3,000 member organizations including governments, industry and expert institutions. The World Energy Council covers all energy resources and technologies of energy supply and demand.

The World Energy Council hosts the World Energy Congress, which is the world's largest and most influential energy event covering all aspects of the energy agenda. Staged every three years, the Congress provides a platform for energy leaders and experts in all aspects of the sector to address the challenges and opportunities facing suppliers and consumers of energy. The 2019 edition took place in Abu Dhabi from 9–12 September, where it was announced that Saint Petersburg will be the host city for the next World Energy Congress in 2022.

The World Energy Council's publications include annual releases like the World Energy Trilemma Index, which compares Energy security, equity and environmental sustainability on a country-by-country basis (also available as an online tool), as well as Insights Briefs on current energy topics such as Blockchain.

Member Committees 

As of March 2019 the World Energy Council has 87 member committees and 2 countries which have direct membership

World Energy Congresses 

 London, 1924
 Berlin, 1930
 Washington, 1936
 London, 1950
 Vienna, 1956
 Melbourne, 1962
 Moscow, 1968
 Bucharest, 1971
 Detroit, 1974
 Istanbul, 1977
 Munich, 1980
 New Delhi, 1983
 Cannes, 1986
 Montreal, 1989
 Madrid, 1992
 Tokyo, 1995
 Houston, 1998
 Buenos Aires, 2001
 Sydney, 2004
 Rome, 2007
 Montreal, 2010
 Daegu, 2013
 Istanbul, 2016
 Abu Dhabi, 2019
 Rotterdam, 2024

Chairs 
1995–1998: John Baker
1998–2001: Jim Adam
2001–2004: Antonio del Rosario
2004–2007: André Caillé
2007–2013: Pierre Gadonneix
2013–2016: Marie-José Nadeau
2016–2019: Younghoon David Kim
2019–2022: Jean-Marie Dauger
2022–present: Michael Howard

Secretaries General 
1924–1928: Daniel Nicol Dunlop
1928–1966: Charles Gray
1966–1986: Eric Ruttley
1986–1998: Ian Lindsay
1998–2008: Gerald Doucet
2008–2009: Kieran O'Brian (acting)
2009–2019: Christoph Frei
2019–present: Angela Wilkinson

Officers 

MICHAEL HOWARD, Chair
LEONHARD BIRNBAUM, Chair – Studies Committee
IBRAHIM AL-MUHANNA, Vice Chair – Special Responsibility Gulf States & Middle East
MATAR AL NEYADI, Vice Chair – UAE Organizing Committee, World Energy Congress 2019, Abu Dhabi
KLAUS-DIETER BARBKNECHT, Vice Chair – Finance
ALEXANDRE PERRA, Vice Chair – Europe
OLEG BUDARGIN, Vice Chair – Responsibility for Regional Development
JOSÉ DA COSTA CARVALHO NETO, Chair – Programme Committee 
CLAUDIA CRONENBOLD, Vice Chair – Latin America&Caribbean 
ROBERT HANF, Vice Chair – North America
ELHAM IBRAHIM, Vice Chair – Africa
SHIGERU MURAKI, Vice Chair – Asia Pacific & South Asia
JOSÉ ANTONIO VARGAS LLERAS, Chair – Communications & Strategy Committee
YOUNGHOON DAVID KIM, Past Chair

See also

 Global warming
 Greenhouse gas

References

External links

 World Energy Congress Abu Dhabi 2019
 World Energy Congress Istanbul 2016
 World Energy Council website
 World Energy Congress Montreal 2010
 World Energy Council - Indicators for Energy Efficiency, Odyssee Program.

International energy organizations
International organisations based in London
1924 establishments in the United Kingdom